The president of Cyprus, officially the President of the Republic of Cyprus,  is the head of state and the head of government of Cyprus. The office was created in 1960, after Cyprus gained its independence from the United Kingdom.

Currently, the president of Cyprus is Nikos Christodoulides since 28 February 2023.

Uniquely among member states of the European Union, in Cyprus the roles of head of state and government are combined, making Cyprus the only EU state with a full presidential system of government.

The 1960 Constitution requires the president to be Greek Cypriot and the vice president to be Turkish Cypriot. The vice president's office has been vacant since the Turkish invasion of the island in 1974 and the ongoing occupation of a part of the country.

The president is officially addressed as "His Excellency".

List
Key
 Elected unopposed
† Died in office

Timeline

Latest election

Statistics

See also
List of colonial governors and administrators of British Cyprus
Politics of Cyprus

Notes

References

External links
Presidency of Cyprus

Lists of political office-holders in Cyprus
 
Politics of Cyprus
1960 establishments in Cyprus